Victory is a 1976 Taiwanese war film directed by Liu Chia-chang, set in the Second Sino-Japanese War. The film won 5 awards at the 1976 Golden Horse Film Festival and Awards, including Best Feature Film.

External links

Films directed by Liu Chia-chang
Taiwanese war films
1970s war films
1970s Mandarin-language films